Jiangzicui (formerly transliterated as Chiangtzu Tsui Station until 2003) is a metro station in New Taipei, Taiwan served by Taipei Metro.

Station overview

This two-level, underground station has an island platform and six exits. It is located at the intersection of Wenhua Road and Shuangshi Road.

The station is not in the same location as the Japanese era station (Gangzui Station), which was located at the intersection of Xianmin Boulevard and Sanmin Road and has since been demolished.

Originally, this station was supposed to be called Shuangshi Station (雙十站), but this was later changed to its current name in reference to a tributary of the Dahan River which the Banqiao Line passes under.

Station layout

Exits
Exit 1: Intersection of Wenhua Rd. Sec. 2 and Shuangshi Rd. Sec. 3
Exit 2: Intersection of Wenhua Rd. Sec. 2 and Shuangshi Rd. Sec. 3
Exit 3: Intersection of Wenhua Rd. Sec. 2 and Shuangshi Rd. Sec. 2 
Exit 4: Intersection of Wenhua Rd. Sec. 2 and Shuangshi Rd. Sec. 2
Exit 5: Near the intersection of Wenhua Rd. Sec. 2 and Renhua St.
Exit 6: Lane 383, Wenhua Rd. Sec. 2 (towards Banqiao)

Incidents

On 21 May 2014, at least 25 people were stabbed in mass stabbing spree by a knife-wielding college student on the Taipei Metro Blue Line. The attack occurred on a train near Jiangzicui Station, resulting in 4 deaths and 24 injured. It was the first fatal attack on the metro system since it began operations in 1996. The suspect is 21-year-old university student Cheng Chieh (鄭捷).

Around the station
 New Taipei City Council
 Stone Sculpture Park
 New Taipei City Public Library
 Banqiao Rural Community Park
 Jiangcui Elementary School
 Wensheng Elementary School
 Jiangcui Junior High School
 Huajiang Market

References

Railway stations opened in 2000
Bannan line stations
Banqiao District